The Kurram Agency War began on 6 April 2007 in Kurram Agency, Federally Administered Tribal Areas, Pakistan when a Sunni gunman on a Friday prayer held by Shia in Parachinar. It left more than 40 people dead and more than 150 people wounded 
.
Tension had been brewing in the area adjacent to the Afghan border since April 1 when the sectarian group Ahl-e-Sunnat Wal Jamaat taking part in Mawlid (prophet Muhammad's birthday) when some of Sunni people having guns shot the Shia people.

April 6 (War Starts)
On Friday, 6 April 17 RabiulAwal, a Sunni gunman fired on a procession (EideMilad u Nabi) held by Shia in Parachinar.
An ambulance was also attacked by sunni Taliban terrorists in the city in which three people, including the organiser of the  Haideri Blood Bank, Inayat Hussain were wounded.
Hospital sources said that three bodies and 18 wounded people had been brought to the agency headquarters hospital. Hundreds of sunnis  were killed by Shia.
Locals said the number of casualties might increase as both sides were using heavy weapons.
Akber Khan Road's Markets, which was full of Taliban forces fighting against Shia, although houses and shops were set ablaze after a big fight by Shia who came from nearest villages resulting in millions of rupees losses. The aim was to flush the sunni  people from the city Which is evident as now only few people of sunni sect left there and no property is owned by them  from Parachinar and surroundings..

The political administration of the Kurram Agency imposed a curfew and additional army troops were called out to stop acts of lawlessness in the area.
A jirga of elders was being convened to broker a ceasefire between the two groups.

April 7 (Army Takes Over)
The army took control of Parachinar on Saturday after overnight heavy gun battles between two sectarian groups. Fierce clashes continued in other parts of the Kurram Agency.
Cobra helicopters targeted suspected locations in and around the town to dislodge combatants from their positions. The army and paramilitary forces, backed by armoured personnel carriers, entered Parachinar and secured positions at around 11 am.

FATA’s secretary for security Arbab Mohammad Arif told reporters in Peshawar that 40 people had been killed and 70 wounded in the two days of fighting.
Officials claim the curfew imposed in the area was effective; the city had been sealed completely and troops were issued a ‘shoot at sight order’ if any person was found violating the curfew.

Hospital sources said 15 bodies had been counted so far and 62 injured had been taken to the city’s main hospital and private clinics.
An official source said three government employees were among the dead.

April 8 (Clashes spread to villages)
Despite the presence of a large number of Taliban forces killed Shia peoples, clashes between rival groups intensified in the Kurram Agency on Sunday. Fifteen more Taliban dead and scores of others wounded amid reports that the rival groups in certain areas had intensified attacks on each other's positions. One woman was among the dead. The road between Parachinar and Thall remained closed and wounded people could not be taken to Peshawar. Doctors said that local hospitals lacked adequate medical and surgical facilities. Four Taliban were killed in Piwar and three in Kirman village. A mortar shell hit a house in Alamsher village, killing one Amin Hussain (Shia). Six Taliban were killed in Sadda town shelling from Balish Khel. Two were killed while loading a mortar gun.

Fierce clashes continued in Tari Mangal-Piwaar, Mali Khel-Boshera, Parachamkani-Kirman and Ibrahimzai-Sadda areas and heavy weapons were used. A heavy exchange of fire was reported from Boshera, 5 km south of Parachinar. The main grid station supplying electricity to Sadda came under attack and power supply to the area was suspended.

Official sources claimed that 25 people had died in the past three days and 140 had suffered injuries, with many of them said to be in critical condition in hospitals. Two of the injured died in a hospital in Parachinar and three in Sadda hospital. The sources said 110 wounded people had been taken to hospitals in Parachinar and 30 to the hospital in Sadda. Political Agent Sahibzada Mohammad Anis said 15 people had died and 40 others wounded.

Administration considered using Cobra helicopters to dislodge armed groups from different locations. The administration persuaded the area MNAs, senators and Maliks to use their influence to broker a truce.
AFP adds: "We have started negotiations with tribal elders to end the fighting," Sahibzada Anis said, adding that troops could be used in some outlying areas if needed.

April 9, 2007 (Clashes Intensify)
A security personnel was killed and several others injured when a mortar shell hit their headquarters.

The security forces have warned to take action if the rival factions did not stop fighting.
Residents said some people had opened fire in Dandar localities of the city on Sunday night, but no casualty was reported. A large area of the agency is without electricity.
Peshawar Corps Commander Lt-Gen Hamid Khan promised security to the residents of Kurram Agency during a visit to the area.

April 10, 2007 (Clashes Continue)
Despite the presence of security forces, heavy fighting between Taliban & Shia in different areas of the Kurram Agency continued for the fifth consecutive day on Tuesday April 10. There is no respite in clashes and residential areas are being targeted with rockets and light cannons, forcing people to evacuate women and children to safe places. The region was without electricity after the main transmission line was attacked by Taliban near Alizai in the Lower Kurram Agency. According to sources, death toll had risen to 50 and hospitals in Parachinar, Sadda and Alizai had received 260 wounded. Doctors said that 173 wounded had been shifted to hospitals in Parachinar and about 65 to the Sadda hospital.

The official death toll from the clashes since April 6 has reached 25, while the unofficial toll is as high as 80. The political administration is using the traditional jirga system to broker a ceasefire. The jirgas are showing results at some places only.

Fresh army troops and paramilitary soldiers were seen heading towards the main bazaar as violence continued in surrounding areas of Parachinar, witnesses told Daily Times.
A doctor who was given permission to go out in the curfew said that private property has been badly damaged in Parachinar bazaar. “Shops have been burnt and no one knows which side has suffered most. Both groups have tried to inflict maximum damage on the other,” said the doctor, asking not to be named.

Sources say that government is falsely claiming the ceasefire in various areas, and government law enforcement agencies found Taliban attacking on civilians as stated that a woman transferring her son wounded to Hospital was shot dead along with her son.
Central leaders of the ISO Shafiq Bangash, Sajid Hussain and others alleged that 10 helicopter gunships were firing at terrorist in different parts of Parachinar.
People here say that city is running out of food.

April 11, 2007 (Failed Balishkhel Coupe)
Government sources claimed that a cease fire was in place in Sadda, while Parachinar was still under curfew.
A reporter of site Shia News has reported that on the night of Tuesday, 10 April, 15  Fighters of Taliban were killed in the area of BalashKhel. They were wearing uniforms of the Pakistani Armed Forces. When trying to enter the town, they were killed by the firing from Shias of Balashkhel, and after the clash the bodies were examined.
War continued in Parachinar in which 6 Shia  have been killed, 2 were injured while 30 Taliban were Killed.
On Wednesday, April 12, Local Shia Fighter launched a cross border attack at the town of Jalmey where 20 Taliban were killed and 22 were injured.   Earlier they had attacked Char Diwar and left 30 of them dead behind them.
In this attack the president of Islamic Education Trust, Taibullah Turi, the grandson of Haji Ali Akbar, and two women: Gulab Nisa and Nasreen Shahid Shahsawar, were counted among the 12 dead.
During this 24-hour period, those persons who were killed included: Rasheed Khan, 
A missile attack was launched from bordering Afghan area Paktia by Taliban.  The target was Bourki town. Ten rockets were observed to have hit there.  In this attack 3 persons were wounded.

April 12, 2007 (Failed Alizai Misadventure)
A huge terrorist brigade consisting 15,000 Taliban attacked two villages of Shia population in Alizai area on late Wednesday night.  In this attack 25 persons were killed, while dozens of houses were set on fire. Reports indicated 10 corpses had been transferred to hospital.  Estimates of injured persons indicated 30 victims.
The towns of Shilozan, Jalmey, and Piwaar were still engaged in fighting while all other parts of the valley were reported to be calm.
The number of people killed after the incident of Alizai reportedly reached 85.

April 13, 2007 (Clashes Extinguish)
Curfew was loosened for two hours on Friday 13, April 2007 from 3:00 PM to 5:00 PM, in the city of Parachinar. An eyewitness told the BBC correspondent by telephone that security forces had set about collecting the unexploded shells of mortar, missiles and rocket propelled grenades.

Public opinion and Role of media
A famous Pakistani politician and former cricketer Imran Khan also the chairman of Pakistan Tehreek-e-Insaf has named this war as American agenda for preparation of attack on Iran.

References

Conflicts in 2007
Kurram District
Terrorist incidents in Pakistan in 2007